Mohammed Abusaban (born 20 January 1990), is a Saudi footballer who plays as central midfielder for Pro League side Al-Fayha.

Career
Abousaban started his career at the youth teams of Hajer. On 4 July 2007, Abousaban joined Al-Ittihad. He was promoted to the first team in 2010 and made his debut in the league match against Al-Shabab on 11 May 2011. During the 2011–12 season, Abousaban started to be included into the squad more often and eventually became a first-team player. On 29 January 2012, Abousaban was fined SAR10,000 and suspended for 4 matches for stepping on Nawaf Al Abed during the Crown Prince Cup semi-finals against Al-Hilal. On 10 April 2012, he was once again suspended for two matches for attacking a player during the league match against Al-Nassr. On 7 May 2012, Abousaban signed a contract extension with Al-Ittihad keeping him at the club until 2017. 

On 22 June 2016, Abousaban left Al-Ittihad and signed a 2-year contract with Al-Fateh. He made 11 appearances for the club and left mid-season. On 31 January 2017, Abousaban joined Al-Taawoun on a six-month loan. On 19 July 2017, Abousaban signed a 2-year contract with Al-Faisaly. He made his debut for Al-Faisaly on 17 August 2017 in the league match against Al-Raed. He also scored his goal for the club during the same match which ended in a 3–2 win for Al-Faisaly. He ended his first season with Al-Faisaly making 28 appearances and scoring 6 goals. His impressive performances earned him a call-up to the Saudi national team for the friendly against Iraq. However, his second season at the club was more disappointing as Abousaban suffered from injuries. He made only 12 appearances in his second season with Al-Faisaly. Following the expiry of his contract, Abousaban joined newly-promoted side Damac. He made 13 appearances in all competitions for the club and scored twice in the league. On 25 January 2020, Abousaban rejoined Al-Taawoun but this time on a permanent basis. He signed a 2 and a half years contract with the club. On 30 January 2022, Abousaban joined Al-Fayha.

Career statistics

Club

References

1990 births
Living people
People from Al-Hasa
Association football midfielders
Saudi Arabian footballers
Hajer FC players
Ittihad FC players
Al-Fateh SC players
Al-Taawoun FC players
Al-Faisaly FC players
Damac FC players
Al-Fayha FC players
Saudi Professional League players
Saudi Arabia international footballers
Saudi Arabia youth international footballers